Patrick Eugene Rooney (born November 28, 1957) is a former Major League Baseball player. He batted and threw right-handed.

Career
He was drafted by the Expos in the 20th round of the 1978 amateur draft. He played his first season in Jamestown, New York in the Class-A New York–Penn League. He played Double-A ball in Memphis, and Triple-A ball in Denver.

Rooney became a Managing Partner of SFX Baseball Group. He is best known as the agent for Jim Thome, Larry Walker, Terry Francona and Charlie Manuel.

External links

1957 births
Living people
American expatriate baseball players in Canada
Baseball players from Chicago
Columbus Clippers players
Denver Bears players
Eastern Illinois Panthers baseball players
Jamestown Expos players
Major League Baseball outfielders
Memphis Chicks players
Montreal Expos players
Syracuse Chiefs players
Wichita Aeros players
American sports agents